Sarah Bradford Landau (1935–2023) was a architectural historian who taught for many years in the Department of Art History at New York University.

Landau earned her B.F.A. at the University of North Carolina (1957).  She earned her Ph.D. (1978) from New York University Institute of Fine Arts, where she was a student of Henry-Russell Hitchcock, the noted architectural historian. Her dissertation chronicled the work of the architects Henry Tuckerman Potter and William Appleton Potter, subsequently published. Other published works include Rise of the New York Skyscraper 1865-1913 (1996), with Carl W. Condit, George B. Post, Architect (1998), and many journal articles including the pioneering study, The Row Houses of New York's West Side (March 1975), which appeared in the Journal of the Society of Architectural Historians. For nine years (1987-1996) she served as a member of the New York City Landmarks Preservation Commission.

Landau has won numerous awards including the American Institute of Architects International Architecture Book Award (1997), the Victorian Society in America Book Award (1997), the Lucy G. Moses Award for Preservation Leadership, New York Landmarks Conservancy (1997) and designation as a Centennial Historian of the City of New York (1999).

Selected writings
 Landau, Sarah Bradford, George B. Post, Architect: Picturesque Designer and Determined Realist, Monacelli Press, New York 1998;  
 Landau, Sarah Bradford, and Condit, Carl W., Rise of the New York Skyscraper, 1865-1913, Yale University Press, New Haven 1996;  
 Landau, Sarah Bradford, and Cigliano, Jan (editors), The Grand American Avenue, 1850 to 1920, Pomegranate Artbooks, San Francisco; American Architectural Foundation, Washington DC 1994.
 Landau, Sarah Bradford, P.B. Wight: Architect, Contractor, and Critic 1838-1925, Art Institute of Chicago, Chicago 1981.
 Landau, Sarah Bradford, Edward T. and William A. Potter, American Victorian Architects, Garland Publishing, New York and London 1979.

References

External links
New York University
 Sarah Landau papers. Held by the Department of Drawings & Archives, Avery Architectural & Fine Arts Library, Columbia University.
 New York Times Obituary
 Society of Architectural Historians Obituary

1935 births
2023 deaths
American architecture writers
American architectural historians
New York University alumni
New York University faculty
American women historians
21st-century American women